Mutant or Mutants, in comics, may refer to:


Marvel Comics
Mutant (Marvel Comics), one of the main causes for super-powered characters in Marvel Comics, as well as a number of titles, groups or characters:
Brotherhood of Mutants, also called the Brotherhood of Evil Mutants, a supervillain group led by Magneto and Mystique
Fall of the Mutants, a 1987 X-Men storyline
Mutant 2099, Chad Channing, a character from the Marvel 2099 universe
Mutant Force, a supervillain group, also called the Resistants
Mutant Liberation Front, a supervillain group
Mutant Massacre, a 1986 X-Men storyline
Mutant Master, a supervillain and member of Factor Three
Mutant Zero, a superhero connected to the Initiative
Mutant X (comics), a fictional universe in Marvel Comics
New Mutants, a superhero team that is an offshoot of the X-Men

DC Comics
Metahuman, the DC-equivalent of Marvel's mutants and mutates
Mutants (DC Comics), a fictional street gang

Other
Mutants (Judge Dredd), people changed by the radiation from the Atomic Wars
Mutants in fiction (including comics)
Teenage Mutant Ninja Turtles, a multimedia franchise centered on a fictional superhero quartet of teenage anthropomorphic turtle ninja

See also
Mutant (disambiguation)